HD 222095 is a single star in the southern constellation of Phoenix, near the western constellation border with Grus. It has a white hue and is visible to the naked eye with an apparent visual magnitude of 4.74. The star is located at a distance of is approximately 200 light years based on parallax, and it is drifting further away with a radial velocity of +3.4 km/s.

This object is an A-type main-sequence star with a stellar classification of A1/2V. It has a high rate of spin with a projected rotational velocity of 141 to 165 km/s, giving it an equatorial bulge that is 4% larger than the polar radius. The star is 482 million years old with 2.55 times the mass of the Sun and around 2.2 times the Sun's radius. It is radiating 41 times the luminosity of the Sun from its photosphere at an effective temperature of 9,230 K. The chemical abundance of the star's outer atmosphere is similar to that in the Sun.

References

A-type main-sequence stars
Phoenix (constellation)
Durchmusterung objects
222095
116602
8959